Skene Boats was  a Canadian boat builder based in Gloucester, Ontario, now part of the city of Ottawa. The company specialized in the  manufacture of fibreglass sailboats. It was founded in 1968 and went out business in 1992.

History

The company was founded by Donald Skene in 1968. Two years later, in 1970, he sold the company to F. Wallis White and George Carlyle. They sold the company to Carl Strike and his partners in 1979 and the company closed in 1992.

The business was located in a small industrial park at 2793 Fenton Road.

The company produced four different designs of small sailing dinghies, including the Phoenix 18 catamaran, Albacore one design racer and the Echo 12. The George Hinterhoeller-designed Cygnus 20 was produced as both a centreboard boat and a keelboat.

Boats 
Summary of boats built by Skene Boats:

Albacore
Cygnus 20
Echo 12
Phoenix 18

See also
List of sailboat designers and manufacturers

References

External links

Skene Boats